The Water Avenue Bridge, officially known as Hope-Fraser Bridge or the Bill Hartley Bridge is a highway bridge that carries the Trans Canada Highway across the Fraser river. It was built around 1916 to carry the Kettle Valley Railroad out of the town of Hope to the CPR mainline on the north side of the river. It is a two level bridge with the highway bridge on top. The bridge had two levels, with vehicular traffic on top, and railway traffic on the lower level. The bridge is no longer used by trains, but the lower deck can be observed from the north (west) bank. The railway, which was long ago removed, ran on the lower level. If you pull off the highway on the north side, eastbound on the highway, and explore under the bridge, this can be clearly seen. The rail bed can be followed a short way west until you come to a private property. Little if anything remains to show that trains ran south and east of the bridge into town.

See also
 List of crossings of the Fraser River
 List of bridges in Canada

References

Road bridges in British Columbia
Bridges on the Trans-Canada Highway